The 1992 Yugoslav People's Army column incident in Sarajevo occurred on 3 May 1992 in Dobrovoljačka Street, Sarajevo, when members of the Bosnian army (ARBiH) attacked a convoy of the Yugoslav army (JNA) troops that were exiting the city of Sarajevo according to the withdrawal agreement.

Background
The attack is thought to have happened in retaliation for the arrest of the President of the Republic of Bosnia and Herzegovina Alija Izetbegović, who was detained at the Sarajevo Airport by the Yugoslav army the previous day.

Attack
The attack started with the convoy being separated when a car was driven into it. Then sporadic and disorganized fighting took place for several minutes in and around the convoy.

Bosnian army commander Sefer Halilovic later stated about the incident "our fighters and civilians acted spontaneously, they cut the convoy in  half."

In his book Peacekeeper: The road to Sarajevo, the UN peacekeepers' commander, General Lewis MacKenzie, who was in the convoy described what he saw: "I could see the Territorial Defense soldiers push the rifles through the windows of civilians' cars, which were part of the convoy, and shoot [...] I saw blood flow down the windshields. It was definitely the worst day of my life."

Aftermath
Serb prosecutors stated that 42 JNA soldiers were killed in the attack on May 2 and 3 throughout Sarajevo and have named case that covers these events "Case Dobrovoljačka". General Milutin Kukanjac, the commander of the JNA in Sarajevo, confirmed that just in Dobrovoljačka street alone 4 officers, one soldier and one civilian were killed in the attack.

Controversy
An investigation was opened by the Serbian Prosecutors Office and has stirred controversy both in Bosnia and Herzegovina and Serbia. Two members of the State Presidency, Haris Silajdžić and Željko Komšić, claimed Serbia's action breached the Rome Agreement. The presidents attended a meeting with members of the wartime Presidency of Bosnia, namely Tatjana Ljujić-Mijatović, Ivo Komšić, Miro Lazović and Ejup Ganić, and concluded that Serbia had breached the 1996 Rome Agreement, failed to seek the ICTY's opinion before taking action and had "therefore breached international legal provisions".

A Belgrade court issued arrest warrants for 19 former Bosnian-government officials. Ejup Ganić, a former member of the Bosnian wartime presidency who was among the people sought for the attack, dismissed the allegations, indicating the attack on the JNA column was aimed at striking at Izetbegović's kidnappers after his capture by Bosnian Serb forces. Ganić was arrested in London, but was quickly released since Judge Timothy Workman ruled that the JNA was an enemy army at war with Bosnia and Herzegovina and thus, a legitimate target. In 2003 The International Tribunal for Justice dismissed the case, stating that the actions of the ArBiH did not constitute a breach of law.

On 3 March 2011, Jovan Divjak was arrested in Vienna due to Serbia's arrest warrant. However, Austria said it will not extradite him to Belgrade. In 2003, the ICTY also ruled that there was no ground for prosecution of Divjak. In 2012, the Prosecutor's Office of Bosnia and Herzegovina did the same.

See also 
1992 Yugoslav People's Army column incident in Tuzla

References 

Bosnian War
History of Sarajevo
1992 in Bosnia and Herzegovina
1990s in Sarajevo
Attacks in 1992
Controversies in Bosnia and Herzegovina
May 1992 events in Europe